Felton is a census-designated place (CDP) in Santa Cruz County, California, United States.

History

Named for John B. Felton, a former Oakland, California mayor, a judge and a San Francisco Bay Area investor in his day, the town is an historic logging community.  Felton served as the lower terminus of the San Lorenzo Valley Logging Flume from Boulder Creek, which began construction in 1874 and when formally opened in October 1875 was augmented by a new rail line to transport logs to the wharf in Santa Cruz.

Felton was incorporated on March  8, 1878, by the Legislature, thereby becoming a town.

Shortly after the Santa Cruz & Felton Railroad began operation, a second rail line began operation in 1880 from Alameda, California, and San Jose, California. A new depot was constructed at "New Felton" using salvaged materials from a dismantled portion of the San Lorenzo Valley Logging Flume from Boulder Creek. The railroads, limekilns and forest in this area provided a majority of the repair materials for the great 1906 San Francisco earthquake. The standard gauge railroad line came into Felton by 1909.

In 1917, Felton was disincorporated by the Legislature, thereby ceasing to exist as a town while relinquishing the responsibilities thereof to the county of Santa Cruz.

In 1927, the Felton community of Lompico, California, was established.

In 1963, the steam-powered Roaring Camp Railroad began tourist operations on the Big Trees Ranch out of the Old Felton Depot. The company later constructed a replica logging camp and another depot farther down the property, and in 1985, took over operations on the old SPC/Southern Pacific standard gauge line to Santa Cruz.  Roaring Camp is a re-creation of an 1880s logging camp and home to the original South Pacific Coast (later Southern Pacific) Felton depot and freight shed, as well as two unique railroads — the Roaring Camp and Big Trees Narrow Gauge Railroad, a steam-powered line up Bear Mountain, and the Santa Cruz, Big Trees and Pacific Railway.

Felton is home to the Felton Covered Bridge, an 80-foot-long covered bridge over the San Lorenzo River built in 1892 and placed on the National Register of Historic Places in 1973.

The Trout Farm Inn was located in Felton. It burned down on June 5, 2016. It reopened in 2022. 

The local high school is San Lorenzo Valley High School. The 2007 boys basketball team won the only Boys Basketball SCCAL Championship in school history. Led by five players who all went to elementary school at the now closed Quail Hollow School. Scott Krueger, Josh Payne, Kyle Morris, Clint Gorman and Taylor West were known as the “Quail Hollow 5.” Their success was helped by the students who would regularly attend their games and called themselves, “The Red Sea.”

On August 20, 2020 at 8:00 AM Pacific Time, due to the CZU Lightning Incident fires of 2020, Felton was ordered to evacuate by the California Department of Forestry and Fire Protection.

Demographics

2010
The 2010 United States Census reported that Felton had a population of 4,057. The racial makeup of Felton was 3,691 (91.0%) White, 25 (0.6%) African American, 29 (0.7%) Native American, 69 (1.7%) Asian, 11 (0.3%) Pacific Islander, 60 (1.5%) from other races, and 172 (4.2%) from two or more races. Hispanic or Latino of any race were 283 persons (7.0%).

The Census reported that 99.4% of the population lived in households and 0.6% lived in non-institutionalized group quarters.

There were 1,700 households, out of which 450 (26.5%) had children under the age of 18 living in them, 795 (46.8%) were opposite-sex married couples living together, 124 (7.3%) had a female householder with no husband present, 69 (4.1%) had a male householder with no wife present.  There were 154 (9.1%) unmarried opposite-sex partnerships, and 27 (1.6%) same-sex married couples or partnerships. 474 households (27.9%) were made up of individuals, and 130 (7.6%) had someone living alone who was 65 years of age or older. The average household size was 2.37.  There were 988 families (58.1% of all households); the average family size was 2.89.

The population was spread out, with 738 people (18.2%) under the age of 18, 300 people (7.4%) aged 18 to 24, 1,048 people (25.8%) aged 25 to 44, 1,560 people (38.5%) aged 45 to 64, and 411 people (10.1%) who were 65 years of age or older.  The median age was 44.0 years. For every 100 females, there were 101.1 males.  For every 100 females age 18 and over, there were 99.5 males.

The homeowner vacancy rate was 2.1%; the rental vacancy rate was 3.0%. 72.8% of the population lived in owner-occupied housing units and 26.6% lived in rental housing units.

2000
As of the census of 2000, there were 1051 people and 517 households in the CDP. The racial makeup of the CDP was 90.58% White, 0.67% African American, 0.57% Native American, 1.43% Asian, 0.10% Pacific Islander, 3.33% from other races, and 3.33% from two or more races. Hispanic or Latino of any race were 7.14% of the population.

There were 393 households, out of which 29.3% had children under the age of 18 living with them, 53.2% were married couples living together, 8.7% had a female householder with no husband present, and 34.9% were non-families. 25.4% of all households were made up of individuals, and 4.6% had someone living alone who was 65 years of age or older.  The average household size was 2.57 and the average family size was 3.06.

In the CDP, the population was spread out, with 26.5% under the age of 18, 10.8% from 18 to 24, 29.7% from 25 to 44, 23.3% from 45 to 64, and 9.6% who were 65 years of age or older.  The median age was 34 years. For every 100 females, there were 104.1 males.  For every 100 females age 18 and over, there were 97.4 males.

The median income for a household in the CDP was $48,102, and the median income for a family was $55,625. Males had a median income of $35,833 versus $26,346 for females. The per capita income for the CDP was $21,488.  About 8.3% of families and 15.8% of the population were below the poverty line, including 20.0% of those under age 18 and none of those age 65 or over.

Government

Economy
A Graniterock quarry is located in Felton. As well as a Granite Construction Quarry and Asphalt Plant

References

Census-designated places in Santa Cruz County, California
Census-designated places in California
1875 establishments in California